Anopheles (Cellia) varuna is a species complex of zoophilic mosquito belonging to the genus Anopheles. It is found in India, Sri Lanka Thailand and Vietnam. It is a secondary malaria vector in Sri Lanka. Larvae are known to feed on detritus, rod and cocci bacteria, diatom, filamentous algae and desmids. A microsporidium Thelohania obscura was discovered from the larvae in India in 1966.

References

External links
Physico-chemical characteristics of Anopheles culicifacies and Anopheles varuna breeding water in a dry zone stream in Sri Lanka.
Confirmation of Anopheles varuna in Vietnam, previously misidentified and mistargeted as the malaria vector Anopheles minimus
Anopheles species diversity and distribution of the malaria vectors of Thailand
Revised morphological identification key to the larval anopheline (Diptera: Culicidae) of Sri Lanka
The dominant Anopheles vectors of human malaria in the Asia-Pacific region: occurrence data, distribution maps and bionomic précis

varuna
Insects described in 1924